Porky's Revenge! is a 1985 sex comedy film and the third and final film of the original Porky's film series. It was directed by James Komack.

Plot
During the semi-final basketball game, the cheerleaders promise the team an orgy if they win. The boys do so. After the game, they are led to one of the girls' homes, and everyone strips down to their underwear and jumps in a swimming pool. In it, the girls throw their underwear out. The boys do likewise, and swim toward the girls. Soon, but too late, they realize the girls are clothed after all and wind up parading nude before the clothed girls and their parents.

Porky now owns a riverboat with a casino and strip club. According to Brian, he is extorting money from Coach Goodenough because he has a gambling debt. The gang decide to go to the boat to take pictures of the illegal casino to give to the D.A. During this time, Meat runs into Porky's sex-crazed daughter, Blossom, who forces herself on him. The boys' plan fails because Porky catches them in the act and is about to kill them. But when they mention the State Championship game, he realizes that they could help him out by throwing the game so he can bet against them.

Later at school, Meat is unable to dissect a frog in science class. Fearing he could become academically ineligible to play in the championship game, the gang goes to Miss Webster's apartment to get a copy of the final exam. They discover her and Mr. Dobish, the school's guidance counselor, having rather kinky extramarital relations.

A letter is written to Ms. Balbricker arranging a rendezvous at a motel with an old boyfriend of hers, while Pee Wee is enticed to the same room by the promise of a night of passion with a beautiful Swedish exchange student. Tommy tricks Pee Wee into going to another location while he heads to the room. Ms. Balbricker arrives first followed by Tommy, and they are horrified to find themselves unclothed and in bed with each other. To make up for their prank on Ms. Balbricker, the gang contacts her old boyfriend and actually gets them together.

Before the final game, Meat is benched because Miss Webster intentionally failed him. Mr. Dobish discovers the blackmail photos and a note and shows Miss Webster, causing her to change her mind. The second half resulted in a victory for Angel Beach while Porky is outraged. Blossom tells him that Meat is her boyfriend and they "went all the way," infuriating him even more. He then suggests to his two subordinates that Meat and Blossom be married.

During the senior prom, Meat is abducted by Porky and his men. The gang goes after them. Just as the wedding is about to start, the power goes out and Meat is liberated by Billy and Brian. They begin their escape in a motorboat, with Porky's boat chasing them closely. The chase ends after they make it through a drawbridge, with Pee Wee then lowering it, resulting in the destruction of Porky's boat.

At graduation, the guys trick Pee Wee into taking off all his clothes, except the graduation gown. As he's about to get his diploma, Principal Carter steps on the gown, causing it to come off and reveal Pee Wee in his nudity, just as he dreamed at the beginning of the film.

Cast

Production
The film's budget was nearly $8 million, much of which was spent on building a large gambling boat. The producers used a $20 million Miami Island mansion, Vizcaya, as a key setting.

The film was the directorial debut of James Komack, who stated "I'm not going to whitewash the bawdiness or clean up the tone of their antics."

Komack thought the sequel, "failed to understand their own formula. Porky's touched on reality, it presented a cross-section of adolescent sex life during a certain time frame. Bob apparently tried to elevate his big success and use it to portray a message. But the original was not a film about humanity; it was a film, pure and simple, about teen-age sex. The sequel, a whitewash of the original, didn't play."

Nancy Parsons had lost a considerable amount of weight since the first film. She agreed to appear in the sequel for a percentage of the profits.

Reception

Box office
The film was the lowest-grossing film in the series with $20,518,905, a substantial drop from the first film's box office of $105,500,000.

Critical response

The film received negative reviews from critics, with review aggregator Rotten Tomatoes gave it a score of 27% based on reviews from 11 critics. Gene Siskel gave it zero stars out of four, writing that "the comedy here operates at the stag party level... a 1950 stag party." Janet Maslin of The New York Times called it "just another brand-name teen-age movie ... Some of it is funny, but it's also entirely predictable." Variety noted that it "barely earns its R rating" and that James Komack's direction "does little to enliven the proceedings," calling the soundtrack "one of the film's few bright spots." Michael Wilmington of the Los Angeles Times called it "a sorry excuse for a movie: loud, lewd, witless and crass ... you might be advised to skip the movie and go directly to the sound-track album." Leonard Maltin's film guide assigned its lowest possible rating of BOMB and wrote, "Beware of high-school seniors with post-collegiate hairlines: these guys are starting to look older than the mid-'50s Bowery Boys. This revenge is preferable to Montezuma's—but not by much."

The film was nominated for a Stinkers Bad Movie Award for Worst Picture.

Soundtrack

The film's soundtrack was released in 1985. Produced and assembled by Dave Edmunds, it features new material from a wide spectrum of well-established rock and roll musicians, including Jeff Beck, George Harrison, Carl Perkins, Willie Nelson and Robert Plant & Phil Collins (under "The Crawling King Snakes" moniker), as well as then up-and-comers The Fabulous Thunderbirds.

Besides George Harrison's recording of a previously unreleased Bob Dylan song ("I Don't Want to Do It") and Dave Edmunds' "High School Nights" and Porky's Revenge! theme music, it consists of newly recorded versions of classic rock and roll tunes (sometimes by their original author, in the case of Carl Perkins). Stephen Thomas Erlewine of AllMusic called it "far more fun than the accompanying film" and said, although disliking some of the 1980s production flourishes, "it's far better to dwell on the fact that a third-rate sequel like Porky's Revenge! could produce a soundtrack this good, because that is a mystery for the ages."

"High School Nights" b/w "Porky's Revenge" and "Do You Want to Dance?" b/w "I Don't Want to Do It" were released as singles.

Track listing

References

External links
 
 
 

1985 films
1980s sex comedy films
1980s teen comedy films
20th Century Fox films
American sex comedy films
American sequel films
Canadian sex comedy films
Canadian sequel films
1980s English-language films
Films set in the 1950s
Films set in Florida
Films shot in Florida
Teen sex comedy films
Albums produced by Dave Edmunds
1985 comedy films
1980s American films
1980s Canadian films